USS Louise may refer to: